Banal is the 2019 Filipino psychological horror film directed by Peter Abanna. The film stars Bianca Umali, Miguel Tanfelix, Andrea Brillantes, Taki and Kim Last.

Plot

Erika Villanueva has a terminally ill mother. She learned from her friend Yella "Yel" De Leon about a sacred mountain where devotees of Mary held a miracle cure that can heal all diseases. Erika enlists the help of her friends Richard "Richie/Rich" Santos, Rithea "Thea" Del Rosario and Jesus "Mac" De Andres to go on hiking on the sacred mountain to find the cure that can save her mother. One night, the group were possessed except for Erika, injuring Thea and Mac. The following morning, Yel went missing, and Mac and Thea were killed by a ghostly figure.

As Rich and Erika continue towards the peak of the mountain, Rich learned from a group of armed men that Erika was chosen to be a demonic sacrificial offering to the God of Tumao, Ina (Mother). There were no devotees of Mary in the mountain, but shamans who worship Ina. Erika was captured and learned that Yel was a member of the cult. Yel considers Erika to be "pure" and was therefore worthy to be sacrificed to Ina. Rich and his group reached the cult just in time, and in the ensuing battle, Yel was injured. Rich and Erika escapes, but Yel offers Erika one last chance to sacrifice her own life in order to save her mother. Using a flare gun, Erika shot Yel which burns her to death. Later on, Erika and Rich are rescued by authorities.

Cast
 Bianca Umali as Erika Villanueva 
 Miguel Tanfelix as Richard "Richie/Rich" Santos
 Andrea Brillantes as Rithea "Thea" Del Rosario 
 Taki as Yella "Yel" De Leon
 Kim Last as Jesus "Mac" De Andres
 Lou Veloso as Manong Cielo
 Ermie Concepcion as Aling Daling
 Arvic James Tan as Ian (Mountaineer 1)
 Francheska Salcedo as Mountaineer 2
 Glydel Mercado as Erika's mother.

References

External links

2010s psychological horror films
2019 films
2019 horror films
Philippine psychological horror films
Filipino-language films